Abdul Mati Klarwein (April 9, 1932 – March 7, 2002) was a French painter of German origin best known for his works used on the covers of music albums.

Personal life
Mati Klarwein was born in Hamburg, Germany. His mother Elsa Kühne was an opera singer and his father Joseph Klarwein was a Brick Expressionist architect and later with the Bauhaus movement. His family was of Jewish origin and they fled to the British Mandate of Palestine when he was two years old, after the rise of Nazi Germany. In 1948, the family fled to Paris when Israel declared independence and Arab nations invaded the country. In Paris, Mati studied from 1949 to 1951 with Fernand Léger, and attended the art schools École des Beaux-Arts and Académie Julian.

Klarwein added "Abdul" (which means "servant" in Arabic) to his name in the late 1950s to express his sentiments about the hostility between Jews and Muslims in the Middle East: he felt that to understand each other better, every Jew should adopt a Muslim first name, and vice versa. In 1956 he met Kitty Lillaz, and traveled with her around the world, including Tibet, India, Bali, North Africa, Turkey, Europe and the Americas.

In the early 1960s he settled for a while in New York City, meeting Jimi Hendrix. At a New York exhibition in 1961, organized by Lillaz for the unveiling of the painting Flight to Egypt Klarwein met Salvador Dalí for the first time, whom he called a spiritual father. The same year he met his wife Sofia Klarwein. Among other painters he met more often was Arik Brauer. In 1965, he obtained French citizenship with the support of André Malraux.

Style and technique
During his time in Saint-Tropez he met Ernst Fuchs, who would have a profound influence on his technique, teaching him the Mischtechnik. Much of Klarwein's most famous work is inspired by surrealism and pop culture, but also reflects his interest in deities and symbolism.

Klarwein is still best known for his art of the 1960s and 1970s, with its clear links to surrealism, popular psychedelic imagery, ethnic and exotic themes, erotic, and religious art from a number of different traditions. He also worked more conventionally across a variety of genres including still life, landscape, and portrait.

Career 
The art and culture magazine Juxtapoz, quoting an unnamed source, wrote that Klarwein was "often considered 'the man literally responsible for every great, legendary record cover you've ever seen—if he didn't do it, he inspired it.'" Despite the hyperbole of this claim, it is true that many people would immediately recognize his vivid, colorful style from many album covers.

1960s
During the '60s Klarwein's fame grew and some of the decade's most progressive musicians used his artwork for their album covers.

In his painting Grain of Sand (1963–1965), many disparate images are combined together in one massive, yet oddly coherent work. Klarwein's own words illuminate the work: "I projected it as a sort of painted musical comedy movie with a Sanskrit swinging cast of thousands, starring Marilyn Monroe, Anita Ekberg, Ray Charles, Pablo Picasso, Brigitte Bardot, Roland Kirk, Cannonball Adderley, Ahmed Abdul Malik, Wonder Woman, Delacroix's Orphan Girl at the Cemetery, Litri and his bullfighters, Lawrence of Arabia, Socrates, Dalí, Rama, Vishnu, Ganesh, the Zork and a Milky Way of Playmates."

1970s 

Klarwein produced comparably striking designs for the covers of two Miles Davis albums, Bitches Brew (1969) and Live-Evil (1971).

Klarwein created the cover for the 2 February 1970 Time magazine issue, showing the face of Barry Commoner, projecting a powerful image of ecology, which took the stage for the first time in the public eye.

[[File:SantanaAbraxas.jpg|thumb|left|Mati Klarwein's 1961 painting Annunciation as artwork for cover of Abraxas (1970)]]
Klarwein's painting Annunciation from 1961 was seen in reproduction by the musician Carlos Santana, who subsequently used it 1970 as the cover image of his band Santana's second album Abraxas.

His painting Zonked (1970) was originally planned as the cover image for Betty Davis's self-titled album, and was later used for the Last Poets album Holy Terror in 1993. In 1971 his cover was on the album Last Days and Time by Earth, Wind & Fire. A cover he made for Jimi Hendrix was used on a single in 1974 and for a compilation in 2010.

In 1971 he went to Hamburg and created set paintings for the film Herman Hesse's Steppenwolf. In the mid-1970s, Klarwein began a series of paintings which he referred to as "real-estate paintings" or "inscapes". In the late 1970s he collaborated with trumpeter Jon Hassell for a couple of albums on Brian Eno's Ambient label; these albums used several of Klarwein's "inscapes" on their covers.

The association of his images with these very successful and widely admired musicians of the time made Klarwein's work known outside the circle of lovers of contemporary art. Many of these paintings, and others, were included in Klarwein's first book Milk n' Honey (1973).

1980s and later 
In the '80s, Klarwein began to focus on landscape compositions, which were detailed, had different perspectives and often included floric textures. During the 1980s and 1990s, Klarwein would occasionally search for cheap paintings at flea markets and "improve" them, painting over them or adding things at his whim. Klarwein made over a hundred of these "improved paintings" throughout his career. In 1983 he published Inscapes Real-Estate Paintings, which included an interview where Klarwein said about his work, "Some visual artworks are made to be talked about more than to be seen, others are made to be seen more than to be talked about.  I think I belong in the latter category."

Klarwein also painted many commissioned portraits, including Robert Graves, Noël Coward, Juliette Binoche, Richard Gere, Michael Douglas and Brigitte Bardot. He died of cancer on March 7, 2002, in Deià, on the Spanish island of Majorca.

Album covers 
 Aïyb Dieng/Bill Laswell - Rhythmagick (1997) (cover)
 Bach/Igor Kipnis/Neville Marriner - The Complete Concertos for Harpsichord and Orchestra (1978)
 Buddy Miles - Message to the People (1971)
 Buddy Miles - Buddy Miles "Live" (1971)[2LP]
 Buddy Miles Express - Hell and Back (1994)
 Earth, Wind & Fire - Last Days and Time (1972) (cover)
 Elements - Illumination (1987)
 Elements - Forward Motion (1990?)
 Eric Dolphy - Iron Man (1963) (cover)
 George Duke - Secret Rendezvous (1984)
 Gregg Allman - Laid Back (1973) (cover)
 Herbie Hancock - Sextant (1973) (cover)
 Hermeto Pascoal e Grupo - Só Não Toca Quem Não Quer (Only If You Don't Want It) (1987)
 Howard Wales & Jerry Garcia - Hooteroll? (1971) (cover)
 Jackie McLean - Demon's Dance (1970) (cover)
 Jam & Spoon (feat. Plavka) - Kaleidoscope (1997)
 Joe Beck - Beck (1975)
 Jon Hassell - Earthquake Island (1978)
 Jon Hassell - Dream Theory in Malaya: Fourth World Volume Two (1981) (cover)
 Jon Hassell - Listening to Pictures (2018) (cover)
 Jon Hassell - Maarifa Street: Magic Realism Volume Two (2005)
 Jon Hassell - Aka/Darbari/Java: Magic Realism (1983) (cover)
 Jon Hassell - Seeing Through Sound (2020) (cover)
 Leonard Bernstein - Age of Anxiety (1966) 
 Malcolm X - By Any Means Necessary (1971)
 Mark Egan - Mosaic (1985)
 Michael Shrieve - Two Doors (1996)
 Miles Davis - Bitches Brew (1970)[2LP]
 Miles Davis - Live-Evil (1971)[2LP] (cover)
 Osibisa - Heads (1972) (cover)
 Per Tjernberg & Mati Klarwein - No Man's Land (1997)
 Per Tjernberg - Universal Riddim (2000)
 Per Tjernberg - Universal Riddim 2 (2005)
 Reuben Wilson - Blue Mode (recorded 1969, released 1970) (cover)
 Santana - Abraxas (1970) (painting title, Annunciation) (cover)
 Symphonic Slam - Symphonic Slam (1976)
 Tempest - Living in Fear (1974) (cover)
 The Chambers Brothers - New Generation (1970)
 The Last Poets - This Is Madness (1971) (cover)
 The Last Poets - Holy Terror (1993)
 The Maids of Gravity - The First Second (1996)
 The Mooney Suzuki - Alive & Amplified (2004) (cover)
 White Lightnin' - White Lightnin'  (1975)

Bibliography
 Milk n' Honey (1973) Harmony Books, New York
 God Jokes (1976) Harmony Books, New York
 Inscapes: Real-Estate Paintings (1983) Harmony Books, New York
 Collected Works 1959-1975 (1988) Raymond Martin Press, Germany
 A Thousand Windows and Improved Paintings: Bad Paintings Made Gooder (1995) Max Publishing, Spain
 Improved Paintings 1979-2000 (2000) Max Publishing, Spain
 Paradise Lost and Found (2005) Consell de Mallorca, Spain  
 Mati & the Music - 52 Album Covers (2012) 213 Librairies, France

References

External links
 MatiKlarweinArt.com, Mati Klarwein online art gallery
 MatiKlarwein.com Artist overview (German)
 
 

1932 births
2002 deaths
20th-century German painters
20th-century German male artists
German male painters
21st-century German painters
21st-century German male artists
Album-cover and concert-poster artists
Jewish painters
German surrealist artists
Artists from Hamburg
Visionary artists
Jewish emigrants from Nazi Germany to Mandatory Palestine